George Nichols III is an American banker and insurance commissioner and executive. He is Kentucky's first African-American insurance commissioner, and in 2000 became the first African-American president of the National Association of Insurance Commissioners.

Background and education 
Born in Bowling Green, Kentucky, George Nichols III was raised by his four older sisters. He  attended Alice Lloyd College and graduated in 1980. From there, he went to get a Bachelor of Arts in sociology and economics at Western Kentucky University and then am M.A. in labor studies from the University of Louisville.

Career 
Nichols worked for New York Life Insurance Company for 17 years, and then became president of the American College of Financial Services in Pennsylvania. He was appointed to the board of directors of Louisville's Republic Bank & Trust Company in 2020. Nichols also worked for Kentucky's Department of Insurance.

Recognitions and accolades 

 First African-American insurance commissioner (1995)
 First African-American president of the National Association of Insurance Commissioners (2000)
 First elected African-American to New York's Life Executive Management Committee (2006)
 "Most Influential Blacks in Corporate America" (2012 and 2018) 
 "The Ten to Watch in 2021"

References 

1960 births
Living people
Western Kentucky University alumni
University of Louisville alumni
People from Bowling Green, Kentucky
Alice Lloyd College people